Cold Eyes of Fear is a 1971 Italian-Spanish thriller film directed by Enzo G. Castellari, starring Fernando Rey.

Plot
A handsome young playboy (Gianni Garko) picks up a pretty Italian girl (Giovanna Ralli) and brings her to his uncle's house for some fun. What he doesn't know is that two dangerous convicts are lying in wait at the house to avenge themselves on the young man's uncle (Fernando Rey), who was the judge who caused them to go to jail. The characters are all trapped together in the house for a very tense night, with the young playboy trying to figure out how to save his uncle from a bomb planted at his uncle's workplace.

Cast 
 Giovanna Ralli: Anna
 Frank Wolff: Arthur Welt
 Fernando Rey: Juez Flower
 Gianni Garko: Peter Flower
 Julián Mateos: Quill
 Karin Schubert: Nightclub Actress

Production
The film was written by Enzo G. Castellari and Tito Carpi. Although Leo Anchóriz of Spain is credited as a co-writer, he didn't have anything to do with the script. His name appears solely for co-production laws that were required to establish the film as a dual-nationality production. Capri and Castellari wrote a film based on the idea of the entire film being set in an apartment, an idea influenced by the film Wait Until Dark. Casterllari was also influenced by William Friedkin's The Boys in the Band (1970) and borrowed plot elements from William Wyler's The Desperate Hours (1955). The film was originally intended for foreign audiences so Castellari and Carpi had their script translated into English by actor Frank Wolff's wife Alice.

The film was shot at Cinecittà in Rome and on location in London. Castellari shot the film in sequence. During filming, Alice left Wolff. Wolff committed suicide a few months after production in December 1971 in his hotel room in Rome.

Release
Cold Eyes of Fear was released in Italy on 6 April 1971, where it was distributed by Cineraid. It grossed a total of 197,089,000 lira domestically. It was released in Madrid Spain on 21 May 1972. It was also released as Desperate Moments.

Reception
AllMovie described the film as a "cleverly crafted giallo-thriller", noting that the film appropriates "some of the form's penchant for cool production design and bizarre cinematography (one scene is shot through ice cubes in a glass)" and that a "kinky S&M stage show which, despite occurring at the start of the film, remains its most memorable sequence." The review concluded that "The rest of this loopy Italian-Spanish co-production isn't bad, however, crisply edited by Vincenzo Tomassi (who went on to edit many of Lucio Fulci's most popular horror films) and well scored by Ennio Morricone" Danny Shipka, author of Perverse Titilation a book about European exploitation films stated that the film appeared to be "designed to be a thriller that incorporated some giallo constructs when the subgenre became lucrative." The review concluded that audiences of either thrillers or gialli were probably disappointed with Cold Eyes of Fear and that "there are plenty of action-packed, gore-soaked gialli to watch, but this is not one of them."

See also
 List of Italian films of 1971
 List of Spanish films of 1971

Notes

References

External links

1971 films
Spanish thriller films
Films directed by Enzo G. Castellari
1970s mystery thriller films
Italian mystery thriller films

Films scored by Ennio Morricone
Films shot in Rome
Films shot in London
1970s Italian-language films
1970s Italian films